Francisco de la Cueva Maldonado (died 15 October 1667) was a Roman Catholic prelate who served as Archbishop of Santo Domingo (1662–1667).

On 21 August 1662, Francisco de la Cueva Maldonado was selected by the King of Spain and confirmed by Pope Alexander VII as Archbishop of Santo Domingo. On 15 August 1664, he was consecrated bishop by Benito de Rivas, Bishop of Puerto Rico. He served as Archbishop of Santo Domingo until his death on 15 October 1667.

References

External links and additional sources
 (for Chronology of Bishops) 
 (for Chronology of Bishops) 

1667 deaths
Bishops appointed by Pope Alexander VII
Roman Catholic archbishops of Santo Domingo
17th-century Roman Catholic archbishops in the Dominican Republic